Lo último (in Spanish: "the last") is the second live album of Argentine thrash metal band Hermética, released in 1995 by the DBN label. 

It was recorded at the Estadio Obras Sanitarias (Buenos Aires) on November 12, 1994. 
The band broke up in early 1995, shortly after the concert, so the sleeve shows both a black cover and a title that suggest that it would be the last CD of Hermética.

Tracklist
 Tano solo 
 Vientos de poder 
 Traición 
 Gil trabajador 
 Otro día para ser 
 Víctimas del vaciamiento 
 Robó un auto 
 Del colimba 
 La revancha de América 
 Vida impersonal 
 Ayer deseo, hoy realidad 
 Cuando duerme la ciudad 
 Soy de la esquina

Personnel
 Ricardo Iorio - Bass, vocals
 Claudio O'Connor - Lead vocals
 Antonio Romano - Guitar
 Claudio Strunz - Drums

References

Hermética albums
Live thrash metal albums
1995 live albums
Live albums recorded in Buenos Aires